The Steadfast Heart is a 1923 American silent drama film directed by Sheridan Hall and produced by George Arliss (Distinctive Pictures). Based upon the novel of the same name by Clarence Budington Kelland, the film was released by Goldwyn Pictures.

Plot
As described in a film magazine review, while a boy, Angus Burke shoots and kills a sheriff that is about to arrest his father. His mother dies, and he is tried for murder but is acquitted. He works for the local newspaper, but prejudice forces him to leave the town. Twelve years later, he returns and takes possession of the newspaper. He exposes a plot that intended to rob the citizens and then weds his childhood sweetheart Lydia.

Cast

Preservation
A print of The Steadfast Heart survives in France at the Centre national du cinéma archive in Fort de Bois-d'Arcy.

References

External links

1923 films
American silent feature films
Films based on American novels
Goldwyn Pictures films
1923 drama films
Silent American drama films
American black-and-white films
1920s American films